A Resident of the City is a 2011 Egyptian film directed by Adham El Sherif.

Theme
In the city, some lead a privileged life, whilst others are mere labour. There are those who live a wretched existence, but at least are free to live a dog's life in the Egyptian capital.

References

External links

2011 films
2011 short films
Egyptian short films